A Digital Strategy Manager is an executive position. This position is based on a unique set of technological knowledge which directs all departments for digital industry growth. A digital strategy manager collaborates with all marketing, business development, and organizational management teams and uses leadership skills to build strategic partnerships.

This position focuses specifically on a corporation’s digital brand by leading, building and maintaining their presence in the digital world. Accountable for driving the prioritization of the technology infrastructure for digital advertising continuity across all multimedia platforms. Manages all related IT departments and functions as a conduit between digital presence and all advertising and/or marketing activities. Consults with all internal directors strategizing their specific marketing needs incorporating the digital technology structure.

See also
 Chief digital officer
 Chief innovation officer
 Chief data officer
 Chief marketing officer

References

Business occupations
Corporate governance
Management occupations
Managers